The Incredible Shrinking Fireman is a platform game for the ZX Spectrum released by Mastertronic in 1986. It was programmed by Andy Mitchell with art by David Kidd.

Gameplay

The Incredible Shrinking Fireman is a platform game in which the player moves the titular fireman through a series of flip-screen rooms attempting to avoid enemies and search for pieces of a Stretching Rack, to return him to full size.  In keeping with other Mastertronic platform games of the era, such as the Magic Knight series, the character must pick up and use various objects encountered on the way to complete the game.  Possession of certain objects provides access to alternate travel routes (such as moving up through the ceiling).

Reception

References

External links 
 

Incredible Shrinking Fireman, The
Incredible Shrinking Fireman, The
Incredible Shrinking Fireman, The
Incredible Shrinking Fireman, The
Incredible Shrinking Fireman, The
Video games developed in the United Kingdom
Platform games
Video games about size change